The Theban Tomb TT7 is located in  Deir el-Medina, part of the Theban Necropolis, on the west bank of the Nile, opposite to Luxor. It is the burial place of the ancient Egyptian artisan (his exact title was Scribe in the Place of Truth) named Ramose, who lived during the 19th Dynasty, during the reign of Ramesses II.

Ramose was the son of Amenemhab and Kakaia. His wife is named Mutemwia.

The tomb consists of a court and a chapel. The chapel is decorated with scenes showing Amenhotep I, Ahmose Nefertari, Horemheb and Tuthmosis IV. Another scene shows King Ramesses II followed by the vizier Paser (TT106) offering before the Theban Triad: Amun, Mut and Khonsu.

Ramose also created a total of three tombs for himself in the necropolis, the others being TT212 and TT250.

See also
 List of Theban tombs

References

Buildings and structures completed in the 13th century BC
Theban tombs